Amomyrtus meli, known as meli, is a species of tree endemic to Chile in the family Myrtaceae.  It grows from Arauco to Chiloe (37 to 42°S). It grows mostly on moist and shaded sites.

Description
It is an evergreen tree or  that measures up to 20 m (65 ft) tall and up to 60 cm (23 in) in diameter, smooth bark, decorticant, reddish-whitish color. The leaves are opposite, oval, lanceolate or elliptical with acute apex which ends in a mucro up to 1 mm long. The leaves are 2-5 long and 0.7-2.5 cm wide, the petioles are 2–4 mm long. Newly shoots are glabrous what make it different from Amomyrtus luma, species to which it resembles very much, The flowers are hermaphrodite, 5 fused sepals and 5 free white petals about 3–4 mm long. The stamens are numerous 40-80 and 5–7 mm long. The fruit is a black purplish-black berry, 5–8 mm in diameter, generally with 3 seeds about 3–4.5 mm.

Etymology
The name Amomyrtus from the Greek Amos; very fragrant, Myrtus is the family's name and Meli is the indigenous mapuche name of the tree.

Cultivation and uses
The wood is extremely hard and resistant and that is why it is used for elaborating tool handles, it is also planted as an ornamental tree because it blooms abundantly and is very fragrant.  Its flowers are important for honey production.

References

External links

Myrtaceae
Endemic flora of Chile
Trees of Chile
Ornamental trees
Trees of mild maritime climate